Frank Mulder (born 5 August 1946) is a retired Dutch rower. He competed at the 1972 Summer Olympics in the eight event and finished in ninth place.

References

1946 births
Living people
Dutch male rowers
Olympic rowers of the Netherlands
Rowers at the 1972 Summer Olympics
Sportspeople from Voorburg